Bhadreswar Tanti is an Indian politician. He was elected to the Members of Parliament the lower house of Indian state from Kaliabor Lok Sabha constituency in Assam in 1984. He was a member of the Asom Gana Parishad. Later he joined Bharat Vikas Morcha.

References

India MPs 1984–1989
1942 births
Living people
Lok Sabha members from Assam
Members of the Assam Legislative Assembly
Asom Gana Parishad politicians